was a Japanese company that was created to manage Niconico. It is a subsidiary of Dwango before absorbed into its parent on October 1, 2015.

References

External links 

Dwango (company)
Former Kadokawa Corporation subsidiaries
Mass media companies based in Tokyo